Wabeeneeye is a sub clan of the Majeerteen clan family and within the larger Harti clan and thereafter in the Darod.

Lineage
There is no clear agreement on the clan and sub-clan structures and many lineages are omitted. The following listing is taken from the World Bank's Conflict in Somalia: Drivers and Dynamics from 2005 and the United Kingdom's Home Office publication, Somalia Assessment 2001.

Darod (Daarood bin Ismaciil)
 Harti
 Majeerteen
Wabeeneeye(Muhammud Majeerteen)
Ali Wabeeneeye
Ahmed Wabeeneeye

References

External links
 The Majeerteen Sultanates

Somali clans in Ethiopia
Majeerteen